Chebara is a settlement in Kenya's Rift Valley Province.

Economy 
The highlands provide adequate rainfall for farming and agriculture which is the economic base of the residents of the Rift Valley.  Tea from the highlands in the Kericho district enjoy a worldwide reputation, but horticulture is an important part of the district's economy and cattle raising is also practised to a large extent.

The full economic potential of the Rift Valley region is, however, far from fully exploited, though the current growth in population and improved education may change this in a near future.  People in the province are still mostly rural, but urbanisation is gradually increasing; new cities and towns contain the rural-urban migration and, provided the right policies are instituted, the Rift Valley province will be able to emerge as a national economic and cultural hub.

Ethnicity 
The people of the Rift Valley are a mesh work of different tribal identities, and the Kalenjin and the Maasai are two of the best known ethnic groups.  Most of Kenya's top runners comes from the Kalenjin community.  The Maasai people have the most recognizable cultural identity, both nationally and internationally, and serve as Kenya's international cultural symbol.

References 

Populated places in Rift Valley Province